In mathematics, two quantities are in the silver ratio (or silver mean) if the ratio of the smaller of those two quantities to the larger quantity is the same as the ratio of the larger quantity to the sum of the smaller quantity and twice the larger quantity (see below). This defines the silver ratio as an irrational mathematical constant, whose value of one plus the square root of 2 is approximately 2.4142135623. Its name is an allusion to the golden ratio; analogously to the way the golden ratio is the limiting ratio of consecutive Fibonacci numbers, the silver ratio is the limiting ratio of consecutive Pell numbers.

Mathematicians have studied the silver ratio since the time of the Greeks (although perhaps without giving a special name until recently) because of its connections to the square root of 2, its convergents, square triangular numbers, Pell numbers, octagons and the like.

The relation described above can be expressed algebraically:

or equivalently,

The silver ratio can also be defined by the simple continued fraction [2; 2, 2, 2, ...]:

The convergents of this continued fraction (...) are ratios of consecutive Pell numbers. These fractions provide accurate rational approximations of the silver ratio, analogous to the approximation of the golden ratio by ratios of consecutive Fibonacci numbers.

The silver rectangle is connected to the regular octagon. If a regular octagon is partitioned into two isosceles trapezoids and a rectangle, then the rectangle is a silver rectangle with an aspect ratio of 1:, and the 4 sides of the trapezoids are in a ratio of 1:1:1:.

Calculation 

For comparison, two quantities a, b with a > b > 0 are said to be in the golden ratio  if,

However, they are in the silver ratio  if,

Equivalently,

Therefore,

Using the quadratic formula, two solutions can be obtained. Because  is the ratio of positive quantities, it is necessarily positive, so,

Properties

Number-theoretic properties 
The silver ratio is a Pisot–Vijayaraghavan number (PV number), as its conjugate  has absolute value less than 1. In fact it is the second smallest quadratic PV number after the golden ratio. In particular, this sequence is not equidistributed mod 1.

Powers 
The lower powers of the silver ratio are

The powers continue in the pattern

where

For example, using this property:

which becomes

Trigonometric properties 

So the area of a regular octagon with side length  is given by

See also
Metallic means
Ammann–Beenker tiling

References

Further reading 
Buitrago, Antonia Redondo (2008). "Polygons, Diagonals, and the Bronze Mean", Nexus Network Journal 9,2: Architecture and Mathematics, p.321-2. Springer Science & Business Media. .

External links 

" An Introduction to Continued Fractions: The Silver Means ",  Fibonacci Numbers and the Golden Section.
"Silver rectangle and its sequence" at Tartapelago by Giorgio Pietrocola

Quadratic irrational numbers
Mathematical constants
Metallic means
Ratios